Princess Amelia had been launched in France or the Netherlands in 1789, almost certainly under another name. She taken in prize in 1801. She made one unsuccessful voyage as a sealer in the British southern whale fishery. Thereafter she became a West Indiaman. She was reportedly broken up in 1807.

Career
Princess Amelia first appeared in Lloyd's Register (LR) in 1801.

On 24 August 1801 Princess Amelia, Swain, master, sailed from Yarmouth for the Southern Fishery. On 24 September she sailed from Portsmouth; on 29 September she was at Falmouth. She continued on, via Madeira, and was reported to have been "all well" on 8 November at Bonavista while on her way to South Georgia.

In December 1801 Princess Amelia, Swain, master, put into Paramaribo in distress. She was next reported returning to London from Surinam. She was too late to go onto South Georgia for the sealing season, and her captain and five crew members had died. She arrived back at Gravesend from Surinam on 8 June 1802.

Princess Amelia, Jarman, master, was in 1804 next reported sailing as a West Indiaman to Trinidad.

Princess Amelia, Bailes, master, arrived at Gravesend on 22 October 1805, from Trinidad.

Fate
Princess Amelia was reported to have been broken up in 1807. The registers continued to carry her for several years, but with stale data.

Citations

1789 ships
Captured ships
Sealing ships
Age of Sail merchant ships of England